Nerthra is a genus of toad bugs in the family Gelastocoridae. There are at least 90 described species in Nerthra.

Species
These 95 species belong to the genus Nerthra:

Fossil species 
†Nerthra bichelata Poinar and Brown 2016 Burmese amber, Myanmar, Cenomanian

References

Further reading

 
 
 
 
 

Nepomorpha genera
Gelastocoridae